Clerodendrum trichotomum, the harlequin glorybower, glorytree or peanut butter tree, is a species of flowering plant in the family Lamiaceae. It is native to China, Korea, Taiwan, Japan, India, and the Philippines.

The fragrant flowers are borne on branching peduncles. They have white petals, held within a green calyx which turns red as the fruits ripen. The fruits (drupes) are white, changing to bright blue and eventually dark blue on maturity. They contain the novel blue pigment trichotomine.

It is cultivated for its fragrant flowers, autumn colour, and ornamental berries. It is hardy but requires a sheltered position. The variety C. trichotomum var. fargesii (Farges' harlequin glorybower) and the cultivar C. trichotomum var. fargesii 'Carnival' have gained the Royal Horticultural Society's Award of Garden Merit.  (confirmed 2017).

Etymology
Clerodendrum is derived from Greek, and means 'chance tree'.

Trichotomum is also derived from Greek, and means 'three-forked' or 'triple-branched'.

References

Further reading

Hillier, J. and A. J. Coombes. The Hillier Manual of Trees and Shrubs. David & Charles. 2007.

trichotomum
Flora of Asia
Garden plants
Plants described in 1784